The 2015 Canning by-election was held for the Australian House of Representatives on Saturday 19 September from 8 am to 6 pm WST. The by-election in the seat of Canning was triggered by the death of sitting Liberal MP Don Randall on 21 July 2015.

Speaker of the House of Representatives Tony Smith issued the writ for the by-election on 17 August 2015. Due to the requirement that the by-election must be held with at least 33 days' notice, the date set for polling day was the earliest possible day for holding it: 19 September. The electoral roll in Canning closed on 24 August and candidate nominations closed on 27 August.

Twelve candidates contested the election. Edith Cowan University political analyst Harry Phillips said despite the Liberals holding Canning since the 2001 election, it would still be a "hotly contested seat".

Candidates

How-to-vote cards
How-to-vote cards are distributed to voters at polling stations to provide information with how the candidate suggests preferences be allocated. Candidates and parties which suggested preferences are shown in each column of the table below. The Sustainable Population Party ran an open card at this by-election.

Timeline of political issues
 15 September – Malcolm Turnbull became the Prime Minister of Australia.
 14 September – Leadership spill: Malcolm Turnbull became prime minister-designate after rolling Tony Abbott as leader of the Liberal Party.
 9 September – Syrian air strikes & refugees: Abbott Government agreed to extend air strikes from Iraq into Syria, and to accept an extra 12,000 refugees from both countries.
 2 September – Economic growth: GDP for the June quarter was 0.2%  and the Australian dollar fell below US70c.
 31 August – Royal Commission into Unions: Royal Commissioner Dyson Heydon dismissed applications to stand-down following his decision to attend a Liberal fundraiser.
 28 August – Operation Fortitude: Australian Border Force cancelled operation after media release led to spontaneous protests in Melbourne.
 26 August – Republican debate: Treasurer Joe Hockey raised debate on an Australian republic.
 24 August – Tax reform: Mr Hockey announced tax reform on the agenda for the next election.
 18 August – Environmental law: Abbott Government announced law changes to stop activists appealing against large development projects.
 17 August – Same sex marriage: Coalition party room voted to not back same sex marriage bill and agreed to take the issue to a plebiscite at the next election.
 6 August – Unemployment rises: July unemployment figures in Australia increased from 6.1% to 6.3%. The total number of hours worked in Australia fell 0.2%.
 5 August – Dual citizenship laws: Department of Immigration and Border secretary Mike Pezzullo, told parliamentary committee that the draft bill needed to be rectified.
 4 August – Ship building: Prime Minister Tony Abbott announced $40b shipbuilding program for South Australia. Austal shipyards in Western Australia missed out.
 4 August – Penalty rates: Productivity Commission recommended reducing Sunday penalty rates to the same conditions as Saturday.
 3 August – Indigenous constitutional recognition: Mr Abbott rejected government support for indigenous recognition process.
 1 August – Speaker resigns: Bronwyn Bishop resigns as Speaker following sustained pressure over her travel expenses.
 29 July –  Free Trade Agreement with China: CFMEU launched campaign against Abbott Government China–Australia Free Trade Agreement.
 24 July – Labor changes immigration policy: Opposition Leader Bill Shorten adopted Abbott Government turn-back-the-boats policy at Labor national conference.

Polling issues

Federal 
The Canning by-election was described by many commentators as a key test for the Abbott government and for the leadership of Prime Minister Tony Abbott. On 14 September, Malcolm Turnbull won the leadership spill against Mr Abbott. In the lead-up to the spill, it was reported Foreign Minister Julie Bishop told Cabinet that Labor wanted the Liberals to win the seat of Canning, so Mr Abbott would not be ousted as Prime Minister, preferring to campaign against him at the next federal election. Earlier in the year, Western Australian backbenchers Luke Simpkins and Don Randall moved a leadership spill against Mr Abbott declaring he had disconnected from voters. The prediction of a 10-point swing against the Liberals in the Canning by-election may have sparked a realisation in the Liberal party that something had to change. Current speculation centres on what effect the leadership spill will have on the by-election. While Labor candidate Matt Keogh had begun to gain traction in the region, Turnbull's election "immediately boosted the numbers for the Liberals". However, analysis of the postal votes, which had been cast before the leadership change, show a similar swing as the polling day votes, indicating that the change in federal Liberal leadership had no effect.

Renewable energy
The solar industry letter-boxed all electors to vote against the Liberal Party and support Labor, Greens and PUP in response to the federal government's intention to scrap the small-scale renewable energy target. The Greens chose renewable energy as one of their main campaign topics, by electing Curtin University sustainability lecturer Vanessa Rauland as their candidate. An opinion poll conducted during the election campaign showed that 65% of voters would support a renewable energy target of 50% by 2030.

Same-sex marriage
Same-sex marriage legislation was identified as an issue that might be decided by a conscience vote in federal parliament. The views of all Canning candidates were surveyed by the Australian Marriage Equality group and the Mandurah Mail. Opposed to same-sex marriage were Andrew Hastie (Liberal), Jamie Van Burgel (Christians), Jim McCourt (Family First) and independent Teresa van Lieshout, while Vimal Sharma (Palmer United) did not answer the question. All other candidates supported same-sex marriage. A survey conducted by ReachTel during the campaign showed 47% of the electorate in support and 41% opposed to same-sex marriage.

Local
Crime
Police statistics in the lead-up to the by-election showed Armadale had one of the highest crime rates in the Perth metropolitan area.

Liberal candidate Andrew Hastie cited crime as a top issue, alongside jobs, and pledged one of the first things he would do if elected would be to take action on methamphetamine and ice. Hastie blamed the previous Labor federal government for leaving a "huge fiscal hole". He advocated a combined "law enforcement and a compassionate community solution". He said, "I would look at bringing a whole bunch of stakeholders together, from law enforcement through to community councillors to educators to medical people and tackling ice head on."

Labor candidate Matt Keogh also said crime and community safety were repeatedly raised by people in the electorate. He attacked the Abbott Government, saying it had cut funding to crisis services and community groups dealing with ice and other drugs, domestic violence and social breakdown. Keogh said the Abbott Government had stripped community organisations of certainty.

Infrastructure funding
The cities of Armadale and Cockburn joined forces to lobby the federal government to try to secure millions of dollars during the campaign to upgrade major road infrastructure. The two councils believed $300 million was needed to transform more of Armadale Road into a dual carriageway and to build a new bridge over Kwinana Freeway to link North Lake Road at Cockburn Central. The councils planned to letter drop householders voting in the Canning by-election urging them to email federal and state MPs to help secure the funding. At the Labor Party state conference on 29 August, Federal Opposition Leader Bill Shorten promised to spend $170 million on infrastructure projects in Canning.

Voter demographics
The Australian Electoral Commission (AEC) announced 112,809 people were eligible to cast a vote in the by-election, after the electoral roll registration for the 19 September poll closed on 24 August. Almost half of those enrolled to vote in the by-election were aged 50 and over, reflecting the high number of retirees in the Western Australian electorate. Just 10 per cent were aged 25 or younger.

Polling places and postal voting
The AEC planned 45 polling places for the by-election, with early postal voting from 25 August. The AEC planned three mobile voting teams on the day, including two teams to visit nursing homes and hospitals, and the third to visit Karnet Prison Farm in Serpentine.

Polling

On 14 September, four days before the election and amid the rolling of Tony Abbott as Prime Minister of Australia, the ReachTel poll showed Liberal at a by-election campaign high of 57% compared to Labor at 43% on two party preferred vote.

Previously, the ReachTEL poll published in The West Australian on 28 August, showed Liberal ahead 51% to 49%. The poll of 782 voters was commissioned by Australian Marriage Equality and WA director Brian Greig said the 62% support for gay marriage among undecided voters could decide the by-election.

Days earlier, the ReachTEL poll published in The West Australian on 26 August, Labor was slightly ahead 50.1% to Liberal on 49.9%. The poll of 768 voters was commissioned by the union United Voice.

On 15–16 August 2015, 508 Canning voters (MoE of 4.3^) were polled by Newspoll via landline phone. Primary votes were Liberal 41% (−10.1), Labor 36% (+9.4), Greens 11% (+3.6), Palmer 2% (−4.9) and Others 10% (+2.0). Based on preference flows at the previous election (which have recently significantly favoured Liberal in national polling compared to respondent-allocated preferences), the two-party vote equated to Liberal 51% (−10.8) and Labor 49% (+10.8).

Two-party-preferred history since 2001

Results

Though the Turnbull Government was just four days old, their candidate Andrew Hastie retained the seat for the Liberals, declared 24 September, despite having to rely on preferences after a substantial, though dampened, primary (−4.15) and two-party (−6.55) swing away from the Liberals − solidly less than the double-digit swings polls had predicted under an Abbott Government − however, some double-digit swings did eventuate among the suburban booths in the north of the seat. The Canning Liberal margin was reduced from safe to marginal status. Political analysts agreed the by-election was a "good outcome for both major parties".

See also
List of Australian federal by-elections

References

External links
2015 Canning by-election: Antony Green ABC
2015 Canning by-election: AEC

2015 elections in Australia
Western Australian federal by-elections
2010s in Western Australia